Deh-e Janjan (also Romanized as Deh-e Jānjān; also known as Jānjān) is a village in Zalu Ab Rural District, in the Central District of Ravansar County, Kermanshah Province, Iran. At the 2006 census, its population was 102, in 25 families.

References 

Populated places in Ravansar County